Wapenamanda District is a district in Enga Province of Papua New Guinea. Its capital is Wapenamanda. The population of the district was 71,797 at the 2011 census. Wapenamanda Airport, the only airport in Enga Province is located in Wapenamanda Town. Air Niugini and PNG Air service flights daily to Wapenamanda out of Port Moresby.

There are three secondary schools in the district which are St Paul's Lutheran Secondary School, Highlands Lutheran International School and the newly created Wapenamanda Foursquare Secondary.

Notable people from Wapenamanda include lawyer, businessman and current Member of Parliament for Wapenamanda Rimbink Pato, former PNG Kumuls and PNG Hunters Grand Final hero Willie Minoga, renowned politician former MP Sir Pato Kakaraya, his son lawyer and NSL Deputy Chairman Dan Kakaraya, Former Chief Justice of Papua New Guinea Sir Salamo Injia, Famed Orator Late Inu Lei, Lawyer and Businessman Late George Tapya Yapao, Former Luluai and first Wapenamanda MP in the house of assembly Late Leme Iangalio and his younger brother former three term MP/Minister and senior statesman Masket Iangalio.

Currently, a cream of Wapenamanda's elites are climbing through the ranks of the government, private sector in the country and in all walks of life. Some of them include Joe Itaki, Director of National Youth Authority. Tommy Kunji Kambu PNG Trade Consul to Taiwan, Israel Kumbu High Impact project Assistant Secretary Department of Works, Robert Salmon Minak General Counsel of PNG Securities Commission (lawyer/author), Stanley Tepend Coach of the Lae Snax Tigers, Gregory Manda private lawyer, Mark Yaka managing director Mineral resources Enga (economist/businessman/philanthropist), Johnson Tolabi Anjo (accountant) businessman, Michael Yai Pupu businessman, Brian Yombon former  High Commissioner, Justin Bero Sarimbu (JBS) private civil engineer.

Wapenamanda, considered one of the province's food baskets is punctuated by a uncompromising landscape that has a fair share of plateaus, valleys, gorges and ravines. The lower Lai basin where famed politicians and orators Sandy Talita and Miki Kaeok hail from is littered with ravines and gorges crafted out of a fertile valley by the Lai river's many centuries of uninterrupted journey towards the Sepik river. To the south of those gorges lie the Minamb valley. On the roof is Tsak LLG and going towards Wabag on the wings of the highlands highway is middle lai.

Wapenamanda is divided into two Local Level Governments – Wapenamanda Rural and Tsak LLG. Tsak is more populous. The road network is being slowly improved by the current MP, Rimbink Pato. Power is slowly being connected, starting with Tsak. The road to Tsak has been sealed. Lowerlai, with a population of about 11,000 people, has not benefited from the power projects, due to politics and the people of Lower Lai's lack of support for the current MP. The road network into lower is also attended to on a piecemeal basis. Digicel mobile communication towers cover 60% of the district. Constituents who reside in lower-lying areas suffer from low bandwidth and network connectivity problems. Wapenamanda has one hospital, the Mambisanda Immanuel Hospital run by the Good News Lutheran Church. Despite clashes for the head bishop position between current bishop David Piso and Bishop Wais and now Bishop Aine, the hospital enjoys less interference in its operations. Law and order is maintained by and self-balancing local leadership structure. However, flare-ups do occur, but peace is generally achieved with compensation and compromise.

References

Districts of Papua New Guinea
Enga Province